The women's 800 metres event at the 2009 Summer Universiade was held on 7–9 July.

Medalists

Results

Heats
Qualification: First 3 of each heat (Q) and the next 4 fastest (q) qualified for the semifinals.

Semifinals
Qualification: First 3 of each semifinal (Q) and the next 2 fastest (q) qualified for the finals.

Final

References

Results (archived)

800
2009 in women's athletics
2009